Albert Ernest Herman (28 March 1879 – 11 February 1924) was an Australian rules footballer who played for the St Kilda Football Club in the Victorian Football League (VFL).

Notes

External links 

1879 births
1924 deaths
Australian rules footballers from Victoria (Australia)
St Kilda Football Club players